James Edward Doyle Jr. (born November 23, 1945) is an American attorney and politician who served as the 44th governor of Wisconsin, serving from January 6, 2003 to January 3, 2011. In his first election to the governorship, he defeated incumbent Governor Scott McCallum by a margin of 45 percent to 41 percent; the Libertarian Party candidate Ed Thompson won 10 percent of the vote. Although in 2002 Democrats increased their number of governorships, Doyle was the only one of them to unseat a Republican. Doyle also served as Wisconsin’s Attorney General for 12 years before becoming Governor. He is currently an attorney 'of counsel' in the Madison, Wisconsin office of the law firm of Foley & Lardner and serves on the corporate board of Epic Systems.

Early life and education
Jim Doyle was born on November 23, 1945, in Washington, D.C., the son of Ruth Bachhuber Doyle and James Edward Doyle, who were influential leaders of the post-1946 Democratic Party of Wisconsin. Doyle Sr. ran unsuccessfully for governor in 1954 and was appointed as a federal judge in 1965. Ruth Bachhuber Doyle was the first woman from Dane County to be elected to the Wisconsin State Assembly in 1948.

Doyle, who graduated from Madison West High School in 1963, attended Stanford University for three years, then returned home to Madison to finish his senior year at the University of Wisconsin–Madison. After graduating from college and inspired by John F. Kennedy's call to public service, Doyle worked as a teacher with his wife, Jessica Doyle in Tunisia as part of the Peace Corps from 1967 to 1969.

In 1972, Doyle earned his Juris Doctor from Harvard Law School. He then moved to the Navajo Indian Reservation in Chinle, Arizona, where he worked as an attorney in a federal legal services office.

Early political career
In 1975, Doyle returned to Madison, Wisconsin, and served three terms as Dane County District Attorney, from 1977 to 1982. After leaving that office, he spent eight years in private practice. Doyle was elected Wisconsin Attorney General in 1990, and reelected in 1994 and 1998. Between 1997 and 1998, he served as the president of the National Association of Attorneys General. During his twelve years as attorney general, Doyle was considered tough on crime, but not unsympathetic to its causes. He also gained recognition as a result of several successful lawsuits against tobacco companies in the state.

Campaigns for governor

2002 gubernatorial election
Doyle ran against Republican Scott McCallum, the former lieutenant governor who had assumed the office of governor in 2001 after Tommy Thompson left to become Secretary of Health and Human Services in the Bush administration.

The 2002 governor's race is considered by some to have been the most negative campaign in the state's history. In response, Libertarian Ed Thompson (brother of Tommy), publicly critical of the negative campaigning of both major party candidates, who became a more viable option for some voters, garnered 10% of the vote.

On election day, Doyle defeated McCallum by over four percent of the vote, becoming the first Democratic governor in the state since Anthony Earl was defeated in 1986. Doyle was sworn in on January 6, 2003 at the State Capitol in Madison.

2006 gubernatorial election

Doyle defeated Republican Congressman Mark Green in 2006. Doyle topped Green 53% to 45% in a year in which no incumbent Democratic governor, senator, or congressman lost their reelection bid.

During the campaign, Doyle was dogged by charges that Georgia Thompson, a state employee, had steered a travel agency contract to a firm whose principals had donated $20,000 to his campaign. Thompson was convicted in federal court in late 2006 and sentenced to 18 months in prison. The conviction was reversed by the 7th Circuit Court of Appeals in April 2007, with one judge calling the U.S. Attorney's case "beyond thin".

Retirement

Doyle raised about $500,000 for a campaign fund in the first half of 2007, leading political analysts to think he would have been financially ready to run for a third-term as governor. In a speech to the state Democratic Party convention on July 6, 2007, he said, "And at the end of these four years of working together, who knows, maybe we'll need four more." He had changed his campaign website to JimDoyle2010.com, which had been seen a further indication of a re-election run. However, on August 17, 2009, Doyle announced that he would not seek a third term.

Governor of Wisconsin

Upon Doyle's taking office, Wisconsin faced a $3.2 billion deficit. The state ended the year 2003 with a deficit of $2.15 billion. Proposals for new programs were constrained by continued budget-cutting and his decision to honor a campaign pledge to not raise taxes. Facing political pressure, he signed a property tax freeze that has resulted in an anticipated decrease in average statewide property taxes in 2003. Doyle's stated priorities were investing in public schools, including the University of Wisconsin System; lowering property taxes; regional economic development; transportation reform; and funding of stem cell research.

On January 2, 2009, Doyle joined the governors of four states in urging the federal government to provide $1 trillion in aid to the country's 50 state governments to help pay for education, welfare and infrastructure as states struggled with steep budget deficits amid a deepening recession.

On May 19, 2009, Doyle proposed a 75-cent-per-pack increase in the cigarette tax, an "assessment" against oil companies to help pay for road improvements, imposition of sales tax on music downloads and cell phone ringtones, and a 1 percent hike in the state income tax for individuals earning above $300,000 a year (approximately 1 percent of the state's population).

Doyle served as chair of the Midwestern Governors Association in 2007.

In October 2007, the Republican-led Assembly, Democratic-controlled Senate, and Governor Doyle passed a balanced budget that approved transferring $200 million from a medical malpractice fund to the Medical assistance trust fund. In July 2010, the Wisconsin Supreme Court ruled that the transfer was illegal and that the state must restore the money to the malpractice fund.

Personal life 
Doyle is married to Jessica Laird Doyle, niece of former Congressman Melvin Laird, and great-granddaughter of William D. Connor, who was lieutenant governor of Wisconsin from 1907–1909, and great-great-granddaughter of Wisconsin State Representative Robert Connor. They have two adopted sons, Gus and Gabe, a daughter-in-law Carrie, a grandson Asiah, and granddaughters Lily and Lucy.

Electoral history

Wisconsin Attorney General (1990, 1994, 1998)

| colspan="6" style="text-align:center;background-color: #e9e9e9;"| Primary election, September 11, 1990

| colspan="6" style="text-align:center;background-color: #e9e9e9;"| General election, November 6, 1990

| colspan="6" style="text-align:center;background-color: #e9e9e9;"| Primary election, September 13, 1994

| colspan="6" style="text-align:center;background-color: #e9e9e9;"| General election, November 8, 1994

| colspan="6" style="text-align:center;background-color: #e9e9e9;"| Primary election, September 8, 1998

| colspan="6" style="text-align:center;background-color: #e9e9e9;"| General election, November 3, 1998

Wisconsin Governor (2002, 2006)

| colspan="6" style="text-align:center;background-color: #e9e9e9;"| Primary election, September 10, 2002

| colspan="6" style="text-align:center;background-color: #e9e9e9;"| General election, November 5, 2002

| colspan="6" style="text-align:center;background-color: #e9e9e9;"| Primary election, September 12, 2006

| colspan="6" style="text-align:center;background-color: #e9e9e9;"| General election, November 7, 2006

Sources
 Laird, Helen L., 'A Mind of Her Own Helen Connor Laird and Her Family 1888–1982' The University of Wisconsin Press, 2006.

References

External links

 James Doyle  in the Dictionary of Wisconsin History, Wisconsin Historical Society
 Peace Corps biography of Jim Doyle
 

|-

|-

|-

1945 births
American educators
Democratic Party governors of Wisconsin
District attorneys in Wisconsin
Harvard Institute of Politics
Harvard Law School alumni
Living people
Peace Corps volunteers
People from Chinle, Arizona
Politicians from Madison, Wisconsin
2008 United States presidential electors
University of Wisconsin–Madison alumni
Wisconsin Attorneys General
Lawyers from Madison, Wisconsin
Madison West High School alumni